Mobaraki may refer to:
 Mobaraki 2
 Mobaraki 3